= Kevin Halligan =

Canadian poet and writer (born 1964)

Kevin Halligan (born 1964) is a Canadian poet and writer who is best known for his poem "The Cockroach" and his poetry collection Utopia. Many of his individual poems were published in the Times Literary Supplement from 1998 to 2006.
